Barsuk Records is an independent record label based in Seattle, Washington, that was founded by the members of the band This Busy Monster, Christopher Possanza and Josh Rosenfeld, in 1998 to release their band's material. Its logo is a drawing of a dog holding a vinyl record in its mouth.

The name of the label comes from the Russian word барсук , "badger". However, the label is named after Christopher Possanza and Jason Avinger's dog, a black Labrador. The dog can be heard barking in two This Busy Monster tracks: "Song 69" and "Time to Sleep".

Artists

 Active Bird Community
 ¡All-Time Quarterback!
 The American Analog Set
 Aqueduct
 Aveo
 Babes
 David Bazan
 Big Scary
 Charly Bliss
 Blunt Mechanic
 Common Holly
 Cymbals Eat Guitars
 Death Cab for Cutie
 The Dismemberment Plan
 Benjamin Gibbard
 Laura Gibson
 The Globes
 Abigail Grush
 Harvey Danger
 Hibou
 Jessamine
 Kind of Like Spitting
 Lackthereof
 Little Champions
 Lo Tom
 The Long Winters
 Maps & Atlases
 Mates of State
 Menomena
 Minor Alps
 Travis Morrison (of the Dismemberment Plan)
 Nada Surf
 Jim Noir
 Pacific Air
 Phantogram
 Pea Soup
 Pearly Gate Music
 The Prom
 Ra Ra Riot
 Ramona Falls
 The Revolutionary Hydra
 Rilo Kiley
 Ruler
 Mathieu Santos
 Say Hi
 Small Feet
 Smoosh
 Chris Staples
 Starlight Mints
 Steady Holiday
 Sunset Valley
 Jesse Sykes & The Sweet Hereafter
 They Might Be Giants
 This Busy Monster
 Trails and Ways
 John Vanderslice
 Viva Voce
 Rocky Votolato
 Chris Walla
 What Made Milwaukee Famous
 The Wooden Birds
 Yellow Ostrich

See also
 Barsuk Records discography

References

External links
 Official site

Record labels established in 1998
American independent record labels
Companies based in Seattle
Indie pop record labels
Rock record labels
Pop record labels